Dehlan (also Romanized as Dehlān and Dahlān) is a village in Kuhsar Rural District, in the Central District of Hashtrud County, East Azerbaijan Province, Iran. At the 2006 census, its population was 131, in 28 families.

References 

Towns and villages in Hashtrud County